Cold chain is defined as the series of actions and equipment applied to maintain a product within a specified low-temperature range from harvest/production to consumption. An unbroken cold chain is an uninterrupted sequence of refrigerated production, storage and distribution activities, along with associated equipment and logistics, which maintain a desired low-temperature interval to keep the safety and quality of perishable or sensitive products, such as foods and medicines. In other words, the term denotes a low temperature-controlled supply chain network used to ensure and extend the shelf life of products, e.g. fresh agricultural produce, seafood, frozen food, photographic film, chemicals, and pharmaceutical products. Such products, during transport and end-use when in transient storage, are sometimes called cool cargo. Unlike other goods or merchandise, cold chain goods are perishable and always en-route towards end use or destination, even when held temporarily in cold stores and hence commonly referred to as "cargo" during its entire logistics cycle. Adequate cold storage, in particular, can be crucial to prevent quantitative and qualitative food losses.

History
Mobile refrigeration with ice from the ice trade began with reefer ships and refrigerator cars (iceboxes on wheels) in the mid-19th century. The term cold chain was first used in 1908. The first effective cold store in the UK opened in 1882 at St Katharine Docks.  It could hold 59,000 carcasses, and by 1911 cold storage capacity in London had reached 2.84 million carcasses.  By 1930 about  a thousand refrigerated meat containers were in use which could be switched from road to railway.

Mobile mechanical refrigeration was invented by Frederick McKinley Jones, who co-founded Thermo King with entrepreneur Joseph A. "Joe" Numero. In 1938 Numero sold his Cinema Supplies Inc. movie sound equipment business to RCA to form the new entity, U.S. Thermo Control Company (later the Thermo King Corporation), in partnership with Jones, his engineer. Jones designed a portable air-cooling unit for trucks carrying perishable food, for which they obtained a patent on 12 July 1940, subsequent to a challenge to invent a refrigerated truck over a 1937 golf game by associates of Numero's, Werner Transportation Co. president Harry Werner, and United States Air Conditioning Co. president Al Fineberg,

This technology has been frequently in use since the 1950s, when it was most often used for preserving animal-based cells or tissue. As medical breakthroughs, such as in cancer treatment, have taken place, the demand for cold chain systems has grown. The COVID-19 pandemic and its associated vaccinations, have caused vastly increased need.

Uses

Cold chains are common in the food and pharmaceutical industries and also in some chemical shipments.

Produce
Unique to fresh produce cargoes, the cold chain requires to additionally maintain product specific environment parameters which include air quality levels (carbon dioxide, oxygen, humidity and others).

Vaccines
The cold chain is used in the supply of vaccines to distant clinics in hot climates served by poorly developed transport networks. Vaccines can lose their efficacy if cold chain management fails. Disruption of a cold chain due to war may produce consequences similar to the smallpox outbreaks in the Philippines during the Spanish–American War, during which the distributed vaccines were inert due to lack of temperature control in transport.

For vaccines, there are different types of cold chains. There is an ultralow, or deep freeze, cold chain for vaccines that require -70 degrees C, such as the Ebola and Pfizer–BioNTech COVID-19 vaccines, and some animal vaccines, such as those for chickens. Next the frozen chain requires -20 degrees C. Varicella and zoster vaccinations require this level. Then the refrigerated chain, which requires temperatures between two and eight degrees C. Most flu vaccinations only require refrigeration.

This creates some issues of distribution for the Pfizer vaccine. It is estimated that only 25 to 30 countries in the world have the infrastructure for the required ultracold cold chain.

Validation

The cold chain distribution process is an extension of the good manufacturing practice (GMP) environment that all drugs and biological products are required to follow, and are enforced by the various health regulatory bodies. As such, the distribution process must be validated to ensure that there is no negative impact to the safety, efficacy or quality of the drug substance. The GMP environment requires that all processes that might impact the safety, efficacy or quality of the drug substance must be validated, including storage and distribution of the drug substance.

A cold chain can be managed by a quality management system. Temperature data loggers and RFID tags help monitor the temperature history of the truck, reefer container, warehouse, etc. and the temperature history of the product being shipped. They also can help determine the remaining shelf life. Also, temperature sensors may need to be National Institute of Standards and Technology (NIST) traceable depending on the body monitoring the cold chain.

See also 

 Bacterial growth
 Dry Ice
 Frank Vale, cold storage pioneer
 HACCP
 Insulated shipping container
 Packaging
 Shelf life
 Temperature control
 Temperature data logger
 Time temperature indicator
 Thermal decomposition
 Thermal insulation
 Tolerance (engineering)
 Transportation management system
 United States Pharmacopeia
 Vaccine storage
 Validation (drug manufacture)
 Verification and validation
 ULT freezer

Sources

References

Further reading 

 Brecht, Protecting Perishable Foods During Transport by Truck and Rail |url=dihagan-hs132800.pdf, USDA Handbook 669, 2019
 Brian Lassen, "Is livestock production prepared for an electrically paralysed world?" J]]
 Explains the vulnerability of the cold chain from electricity dependence.
 Manual on the Management, Maintenance and Use of Blood Cold Chain Equipment, World Health Organization, 2005, 
 Pawanexh Kohli, "Fruits and Vegetables Post-Harvest Care: The Basics", Explains why the cold chain is required for fruits and vegetables.
 Clive, D., Cold and Chilled Storage Technology, 1997, 
 EN 12830:1999 Temperature recorders for the transport, storage and distribution of chilled, frozen and deep-frozen/quick-frozen food and ice cream
 Ray Cowland, Developing ISTA Cold Chain Environmental Standards, 2007. 

Supply chain management
Logistics
Food safety
Temperature control
Cooling technology
Pharmaceutical industry
Packaging